Jared Potter Kirtland (November 10, 1793 – December 10, 1877) was a naturalist, malacologist, and politician most active in the U.S. state of Ohio, where he served as a probate judge, and in the Ohio House of Representatives. He was also a physician and co-founder of Western Reserve University's Medical School, as well as what would become the Cleveland Museum of Natural History.

Early Life
Kirtland was born in Wallingford, Connecticut.  His mother was Mary, daughter of Dr. Jared Potter, a famous physician of Wallingford. His father, Turhand Kirtland, was largely interested in the purchases made by the Connecticut Land Company in Ohio, and moved to the Western Reserve in 1803.  In the meantime the son remained in Wallingford. When Potter died in 1810, he left a legacy to provide for Jared's medical education at Edinburgh. But the War of 1812 with Great Britain prevented the voyage, and when the Yale School of Medicine went into operation in 1813, Kirtland was the first matriculated student in a class of 38 members.  He was married in May, 1814, to Caroline, second daughter of Joshua Atwater, of Wallingford, and after graduation in 1815 he practiced in Wallingford until 1818, when he made a journey to Ohio to perfect arrangements for a removal thither. But on returning for his family he found a peculiarly attractive opportunity for establishing himself in Durham, Conn., and there remained until the death of his wife in 1823, when he carried out his intention of settling in Poland, Ohio.

He had acquired a large country practice, and had also been for three terms a member of the legislature, when in 1837 he was elected to the professorship of the theory and practice of medicine in the Ohio Medical College at Cincinnati.  He resigned this position in 1842, having in the meantime purchased a fine fruit farm in East Rockport, five miles from the city of Cleveland, where he spent the rest of his life. In 1843 the medical department of the Western Reserve College was established, at Cleveland, and he filled the chair of theory and practice in that institution until 1864. He was elected an Associate Fellow of the American Academy of Arts and Sciences in 1855. Twenty years later, in 1875, he was elected as a member to the American Philosophical Society.

Besides his professional attainments, Dr. Kirtland was interested in all departments of natural history. He was an efficient assistant in the first geological survey of Ohio, and was untiring in his efforts to improve the horticulture and agriculture of his adopted state. He died at his residence in East Rockport, December 10, 1877, aged 84 years.

Shortly after the death of his first wife he was married to  Hannah F. Toucey, of Newtown, Conn.  Of three children by his first marriage, one daughter survived him.

Taxon described by him
See :Category:Taxa named by Jared Potter Kirtland

Taxon named in his honor 
Kirtland's warbler (Setophaga kirtlandii), Kirtland's snake (Clonophis kirtlandii), and the forest vine snake (Thelotornis kirtlandii) are named after him.

References

Sources
"Jared Potter Kirtland" at the Dittrick Medical History Center
"Jared Potter Kirtland" at the Illinois Natural History Survey, hosted by the University of Illinois at Urbana-Champaign
"Jared Potter Kirtland" at the Encyclopedia of Cleveland History

External links
 National Academy of Sciences Biographical Memoir
 
 

American naturalists
1793 births
1877 deaths
People from Wallingford, Connecticut
Members of the Ohio House of Representatives
Physicians from Ohio
American malacologists
Fellows of the American Academy of Arts and Sciences
Yale School of Medicine alumni
University of Cincinnati faculty
Case Western Reserve University faculty
19th-century American politicians
People from Poland, Ohio